In sport, score is a quantitative measure of the relative performance of opponents in a sporting discipline. Score is usually measured in the abstract unit of points, and events in the competition can raise or lower the score of the involved parties. Most games with score use it as a quantitative indicator of success in the game, and in competition, a goal is often made of attaining a better score than one's opponents in order to win.

In team sport, the most common point metric is the "goal" or "score". Goals are accrued by the respective teams, and the match score represents the total score accrued by each team. For example, in association football and hockey goals are achieved by putting the ball in the opposing team's net. Other team sports like rugby, baseball and cricket have more complicated scoring procedures. The winning team is that which has recorded the best score, usually the team with the higher total score; a draw or tie is a result in which the competing teams record an equal score, sometimes requiring a tiebreaker.

Individual-based sports, such as golf and tennis, have points-based scoring as well. These may be abstract quantities defined for the sport, or more natural measures such as a distance or duration. Each competing athlete accrues points based on the sport's scoring system, and the athlete with the best score is deemed the winner. In some sports, the best score is that of the competitor with the highest score, such as in tennis or high jump. In other sports, the best score is that of the competitor with the lowest score, such as in golf or the 100 metres sprint.

Most sports have time limits, which means point-based victories are usually the result of obtaining more points than one's opponent. In others, the winner must achieve a fixed number of points sooner than the rival. In some sports there is a perfect score that is the highest attainable, such as a 6.0 or 10.0. In boxing and mixed martial arts, a match runs an agreed number of timed rounds, each scored at its conclusion with a mandatory 10 points for winning and 9 or fewer for losing, depending on relative inefficiency. If either player scores a knockout or submission, they immediately win the match regardless of points or time.

Auto racing
Each motor racing series has a points system, and a set of rules and regulations that define how points are accrued. Nearly all series award points according to the finishing position of the competitors in each race. Some series only award points for a certain number of finishing positions. In Formula One, for example, only the top ten finishers get points. Drivers may be forced to finish the race or complete a certain number of the laps in order to score points.

In some series, points are also awarded based on lap leading, lap times, overtaking and qualifying positions (in particular by achieving pole positions and fastest laps). In NASCAR, for example, besides receiving points depending on the final standings, one point is awarded for leading a lap and one point for leading the most laps in the race. In other series, such as for the National Hot Rod Association, points are awarded for attempting the race along with a podium finish in any of the four qualifying rounds, as an incentive to have drivers participate week after week to compete.

Scoring by sport
Each sport has a system by which scoring is determined and tracked. Sports that use duration include many disciplines in athletics (track events of track and field, road running, cross country running and racewalking), and skiing (alpine skiing and cross-country skiing).

Other disciplines are scored based on a distance or height, including the athletics disciplines of shot put, discus throw, hammer throw, javelin throw, long jump, triple jump, high jump, and pole vault.

Some sports have scoring based on a duration to which is added a penalty time based on the events of the competition. For example, in biathlon an athlete is made to ski a penalty loop for each target missed in the target-shooting portion of the event, causing an increase in the athlete's elapsed time in the competition.

In the equestrian discipline of show jumping, the duration of the performance is complemented with faults which are assessed for exceeding a maximum allowable time for the event (time fault), or if the horse refuses to jump over an obstacle or knocks down a rail of an obstacle.

In most racket sports and Net sports a single point is earned when the other team commits a fault or rule infraction. Most such sports apply rally scoring, in which case either team can earn a point regardless of who is serving, but some apply side-out scoring where only the serving team can earn a point. Tennis utilizes rally scoring but has specialized rules for tracking the score.

 
Terminology used in multiple sports